What a Man Wants is a 2018 South Korean romantic comedy film directed by Lee Byeong-heon. It stars Lee Sung-min, Shin Ha-kyun, Song Ji-hyo and Lee El.

Premise 
Set against the backdrop of Jeju Island, the film follows four people seeking adventure and finding the loves of their lives.

Cast
 Lee Sung-min as Seok-geun
A womanizer and older brother of Mi-young
 Shin Ha-kyun as Bong-soo
An aspiring chef and submissive husband
 Song Ji-hyo as Mi-young
Bong-soo's wife and Seok-geun's younger sister
 Lee El as Jenny
A woman whom Bong-soo is attracted to
Jang Young-nam as Dam-deok
Seok-geun's wife
Go Jun as Hyo-bong

Production
Filming began on March 13, 2017.

Release
The film was released in local cinemas on April 5, 2018.

References

External links
 

What a Man Wants at Naver Movies 

South Korean romantic comedy films
2018 films
2018 romantic comedy films
Next Entertainment World films
2010s South Korean films
2010s Korean-language films